The Manalapan EpiCentre opened in 2002 on the corner of U.S. Route 9 southbound and Symmes Drive in Manalapan, New Jersey. The mall serves the Marlboro and Freehold area. It replaced the earlier Manalapan Mall that was demolished in 1998.

History

The Manalapan Mall was a shopping mall in Manalapan, New Jersey. It opened in 1971 on the corner of U.S. Route 9 southbound and Symmes Drive and was demolished in 1998 to be replaced by the Manalapan EpiCentre. 
The mall was anchored by Steinbach, and had 25 stores attached to its south side. A second phase would have included a Macy's, a Sears, and would have grown to a total of 100 stores, but the plans were shelved because of financial problems. In 1996, the Steinbach chain was bought out, and the Manalapan Mall store was not included in the purchase. The former Steinbach store was converted to a Value City location. In October 2008, Value City declared bankruptcy and announced they would close all stores by early 2009. The Value City became a P. C. Richard & Son, which opened on November 11, 2011. A Sports Authority opened on August 11, 2012, in the same building as the P. C. Richard & Son, along with a Bonefish Grill on January 27, 2014. Sports Authority only lasted less than four years as they closed in June 2016, two months before the company went out of business as a whole. On February 28, 2019, the space was replaced with HomeSense.

A proposal in the early 1990s to expand the deteriorating mall faced opposition from neighbors fearing increased traffic. By the late 1990s, while Freehold Raceway Mall was prospering, Manalapan Mall was becoming a dead mall.

The HomeSense store site is a stand-alone store while the south and west corners of the old mall were turned into Wegmans, The Wiz (which was closed in 2003 and replaced by HomeGoods), Dick's Sporting Goods (which later moved to a space at the Freehold Raceway Mall and was replaced by Marshall's) and a Target. Other smaller businesses in the Manalapan EpiCentre are Applebee's, Verizon, Pet Valu, Eyechic Optical Boutique, Gary's Jewelers, Hand & Stone, Cucina Alessi Italian Ristorante, and The Turning Point.

In 2005, plans were released to build an alternative mall facility that would include  of space, including retailers, a multiplex theater and hotel.

References

Shopping malls established in 2002
Shopping malls in New Jersey
Buildings and structures in Monmouth County, New Jersey
Manalapan Township, New Jersey
U.S. Route 9
2002 establishments in New Jersey